A back examination is a portion of a physical examination used to identify potential pathology involving the back.

In addition to the general examinations performed on any joint (inspection, palpation, range of motion, and distal pulse, strength, sensation, and reflexes), there are several specialized maneuvers specific to the back examination. These components include:

 Gait
 Straight leg raise
 Waddell's signs
 Schober's test

Evidence from the back examination indicating possible spinal damage may prompt a rectal examination to identify intact tone.

References

Musculoskeletal examination